Gaurish Akki is an Indian journalist and television news anchor and Kannada Film Director and Actor. A well known name in the visual News media of Karnataka, Gaurish Akki hails from Koppal district, Karnataka.

Early life and education 
Gaurish was born in a village named Mudhol in Yelburga Taluk of Koppal District in Karnataka.  Educated in different districts of north Karnataka like Bidar and Belgaum, he completed M A in English Literature from Karnataka University, Dharwad in 1997.

Career 
Gaurish started his career as a lecturer in Maharani Lakshmi Ammanni college and also worked in S Nijalingappa college, Bengaluru. Gaurish switchedover to media after one year. He was always passionate about media, be it big screen or small.

Starting his news career with Etv Kannada news Channel in the year 2000, Gaurish worked for ETV news Hyderabad, in various capacities like Voice over artist, then Copy editor, then Bulletin producer and Program Producer.

Then in the year 2005 March, he came to Bangalore and joined TV9 (Kannada). He is one of those few founding members of tv9, who worked before the inception of the channel and one of those important reasons for the TV9 Kannada's success. Though anchored umpteenth programs of different genres like politics, social and cultural issues, he made his special mark in the Entertainment Section. Having the credit of interviewing all the bigwigs of sandalwood, his two super hit interview series were  "Sakhathmaathu " and "Premapallavi". Another notable series of those times was "Flash back"

After almost five years of in TV9, Gaurish Akki joined Suvarna News 24/7 in 2010 and served there for 3 years..Heading the cinema team, produced the daily dose of glamour world, in the program called Cinema Hungama and he also produced and directed several programs... one series that grabbed the maximum eyeballs was " Out of focus". He also nurtured many talents in this period. From May 2016 to June 2017 he worked for Suddi TV as chief Anchor and now working on some more ideas of movies, web series etc.
 
For his exemplary service in the field of Media, Gaurish has received many awards and felicitations, State media Academy Award by state Government in 2007 as Best News presenter and Best Interviewer award by Cable Varthe magazine in 2008, and Vocational Excellence by Rotary in 2009 were to name few.

Film career
Gaurish started his film career as an Actor in the Kannada movie Sipayee.  He wrote and directed his debut Kannada movie "Cinema My Darling" which released in March 2016 . After that he acted as a lead Actor (in a novel based) Kannada movie called Kengulabi which is slated for release in 2018.

Awards 
Gaurish has received several awards:
 2007 – State  media Academy  Award by state Government in 2007 as Best News presenter 
 2008 – Best Interviewer award by Cable Varthe magazine
 2009 – Vocational Excellence by Rotary

Filmography

References

External links 
 https://www.imdb.com/name/nm8025371/
 http://www.iuemag.com/april2016/li/redifining-versatility-gowrish-akki.php
 https://www.facebook.com/gaurishakki
 https://www.filmibeat.com/celebs/gaurish-akki.html
 https://www.facebook.com/AlmaSuperMediaSchool/

Living people
Kannada-language journalists
Kannada television news anchors
Kannada television journalists
Kannada film directors
Male actors in Kannada cinema
20th-century Indian journalists
Indian television news anchors
Indian television talk show hosts
Indian male journalists
Indian male television journalists
Indian political journalists
Year of birth missing (living people)